Vítor Reis Alves (born 7 March 1991), known as Vitinha, is a Portuguese professional footballer who plays for S.C. Praiense as a midfielder.

External links

Portuguese League profile 

1991 births
Living people
People from Ponta Delgada
Portuguese footballers
Association football midfielders
Liga Portugal 2 players
Segunda Divisão players
S.C. Praiense players
C.D. Santa Clara players